The Geneva International Discussions (GID) are international talks to address the consequences of the 2008 conflict in Georgia. They were launched in Geneva, Switzerland, in October 2008 and are co-chaired by the Organization for Security and Co-operation in Europe (OSCE), the European Union (EU), and the United Nations (UN), the Geneva process brings together representatives of the participants of the conflict—Georgia, Russia, and Georgia's breakaway Abkhazia and South Ossetia—as well as the United States.

After the cessation of the UN and OSCE missions in Abkhazia and South Ossetia, respectively, following the August 2008 Russo–Georgian war, the GID remain the only platform for all interested sides to discuss security-related issues and humanitarian needs of the conflict-affected population.

The commitment of non-use of force is one of the principal issues at point discussed at several GID rounds. Georgia had made a unilateral pledge of non-use of force on 23 November 2010 and has since insisted Russia should do the same. The Russian government refuses to follow the suit, alleging it is not a party to the conflict. Instead, it wants Georgia to sign treaties envisaging non-use of force directly with Abkhazia and South Ossetia, which Georgia refuses on account of the entities being part of its sovereign state. Russia has also expressed its concerns over the Georgians relations with NATO and military cooperation with the United States.

Another major source of disagreement is the issue of return of internally displaced persons (IDPs) and refugees, mostly ethnic Georgians, which the Abkhaz and South Ossetian representatives, with Russian backing, reject to discuss as long as Georgia is able to secure the yearly resolutions on IDPs at the UN General Assembly. Among topics touched upon the talks are those related to language of instruction in schools in predominantly ethnic Georgian areas of Abkhazia (such as the Gali district) as well as freedom of movement and mobility, missing persons, environmental and cultural heritage.

In the summer of 2016, the Abkhaz Vice-Minister of Foreign Affairs, Kan Taniya, said in an interview with the German newspaper junge Welt that the discussions in the Geneva International Discussions are locked in a standstill.

References 

Russo-Georgian War
Aftermath of war
Georgia (country)–Russia relations
Politics of Abkhazia
Politics of South Ossetia
Georgian–Ossetian conflict
Abkhaz–Georgian conflict
Georgia (country)–European Union relations
2008 in Georgia (country)